Bruce South was a federal electoral district  in Ontario, Canada, that was represented in the House of Commons of Canada from 1867 to 1882 and from 1903 to 1935.

The original district was created by the British North America Act of 1867. It consisted of the Townships of Kincardine (including the Village of Kincardine), Greenock Brant, Huron, Kinloss, Culross, and Carrick. It was abolished in 1882 when it was redistributed between Bruce East and Bruce West ridings.

It was recreated in 1903 from those two ridings. The second incarnation of the south riding consisted of the townships of Brant, Carrick, Culross, Elderslie, Greenock, Huron, and Kinloss, the town of Walkerton, and the villages of Chelsey, Lucknow, Paisley and Teeswater in the county of Bruce.

In 1924, it was redefined to consist of the part of the county of Bruce lying south of and including the townships of Huron, Kinloss, Greenock and Elderslie.

The electoral district was abolished in 1933 when it was merged into Bruce riding.

Members of Parliament

This riding elected the following Members of Parliament:

1867-1882
Francis Hurdon, Conservative (1867–1872)
Edward Blake, Liberal (1872–1878)
Alexander Shaw, Liberal-Conservative (1878–1882)

1904-1935
Peter H. McKenzie, Liberal (1904–1908)
James J. Donnelly, Conservative (1908–1913)
Reuben Eldridge Truax, Liberal (1913–1921)
John Walter Findlay, Progressive (1921–1925)
Walter Allan Hall, Liberal (1925–1935)

Election results

1867-1882

|}

On Mr. Blake's appointment as Minister without Portfolio, 7 November 1873:

|}

|}

By-Election:   On Mr. Blake's appointment as Minister of Justice, 19 May 1875:

|}

|}

1904-1935

|}

|}

|}

Mr. J.J. Donnelly summoned to the Senate, 26 May 1913:

|}

|}

 |}

|}

|}

|}

See also 

 List of Canadian federal electoral districts
 Past Canadian electoral districts

References

External links 
Riding history 1867-1882 from the Library of Parliament
Riding history 1904-1935 from the Library of Parliament

Former federal electoral districts of Ontario